The Military Band of the General Staff of the Armed Forces of Transnistria (Russian:Оркестр Главного штаба Вооружённых сил ПМР) is the central military band of the Armed Forces of Transnistria. The repertoire of the band includes over 500 works by classical composers, as well as contemporary authors and arrangers.

History 
The Band of the General Staff of the Armed Forces of Transnistria was established by order of the Minister of Defense on 29 March 1993. At that time it was led by Vladimir Simachenko who began the formation of the staff and the organization of the creative team.  The first serious test of the fledgling band was at a military parade dedicated to the third anniversary of the founding of the PMR held on Republic Day in 1993. In a short time, the band became famous and recognizable. In 1997, Vitaly Voynov was appointed director of music of the band. This period in the bamd has been known as a turning point. For the first time during his tenure, experienced musicians began to join the band. Most of the new musicians have devoted more than one year to the military band services in the Russian, Moldovan, and Ukrainian armies. In May 2011, the band took part in a review of military bands held in St. Petersburg, one of the few foreign engagements it has taken. It celebrated its silver jubilee in 2018 with a gala concert at the its 25th anniversary with a large gala concert in the Aronetskoy Transnistrian State Drama and Comedy Theater.

List of directors 
 Vladimir Simachenko (March 29, 1993 – 1996)
 Lieutenant Colonel Valentin Memey (1996 – 1997)
 Colonel Vitaliy Voinov (1997 – Present)

Gallery

See also
 Presidential Band of the Republic of Moldova
 National Exemplary Band of the Armed Forces of Ukraine
 Special Exemplary Military Band of the Guard of Honor Battalion of Russia

References 

Military bands
Military units and formations established in 1993
Musical groups established in 1993
Military of Transnistria